The women's 400m freestyle S10 event at the 2012 Summer Paralympics took place at the  London Aquatics Centre on 5 September. There were two heats; the swimmers with the eight fastest times advanced to the final.

Results

Heats
Competed from 10:11.

Heat 1

Heat 2

Final
Competed at 17:58.

 
'Q = qualified for final. AF = African Record.

References
Official London 2012 Paralympics Results: Heats 
Official London 2012 Paralympics Results: Final 

Swimming at the 2012 Summer Paralympics
2012 in women's swimming